Ronald Lyle Clark, Jr. (born October 24, 1972) is an American educator and reality television personality. He has taught in North Carolina and New York City; later in life, he founded the Ron Clark Academy in Atlanta, Georgia. Clark is a New York Times bestselling author and motivational speaker on the topic of inspiring educators.

In 2019, Clark competed in Survivor: Edge of Extinction, the 38th season of the reality television show Survivor.

Background
Clark attended school in his earlier years within the Beaufort County school systems in the town of Chocowinity, North Carolina. Clark was an outgoing student who later graduated from Chocowinity High School with the Class of 1990. After graduation, Clark's goals were to become an educator at East Carolina University through the North Carolina Teaching Fellows program. Following his graduation, he traveled for a time and then began working in Aurora, North Carolina. Four years later he began teaching elementary school in New York City's Harlem. In the fall of 2007 Clark and co-founder Kim Bearden began the Ron Clark Academy, a private non-profit school in Atlanta, Georgia, which follows a unique curriculum.

Pedagogical ideas
Clark has written four books on education:
 The Essential 55: An Award-Winning Educator's Rules for Discovering the Successful Student in Every Child (2003)
 The Excellent 11: Qualities Teachers and Parents Use to Motivate, Inspire, and Educate Children (2005)
The End of Molasses Classes: Getting Our Kids Unstuck: 101 Extraordinary Solutions for Parents and Teachers (2011), listing solutions for parents and teachers
 Move Your Bus: An Extraordinary New Approach to Accelerating Success in Work and Life (2015), philosophy on types of employees/educators and how to motivate them

Clark proposed fifty-five essential rules for success in and out of the classroom, many of which focus on respect and school policies. These include "Make eye contact, respect others' ideas and opinions, always be honest, and do not bring Doritos into the school building". He later proposed eleven traits of excellence: enthusiasm, adventure, creativity, reflection, balance, compassion, confidence, humor, common sense, appreciation and resilience.

Accolades
Clark has appeared on national TV shows, including two appearances on The Oprah Winfrey Show, where Winfrey named him as her first "Phenomenal Man." In 2000, Clark received the Disney Teacher of the Year award. Clark's first year in Harlem was the focus of a 2006 made-for-TV movie, The Ron Clark Story starring Matthew Perry.

Survivor
In 2019, Clark competed in Survivor: Edge of Extinction, the 38th season of the reality T.V. show Survivor. He was the 13th person voted out of the game. He made the jury and voted for Chris Underwood to win the game.

Personal life
Clark is married to his husband Lloyd, who appeared in the Loved Ones Visit segment of Survivor: Edge of Extinction.

References

External links 
 Ron Clark Academy Website
 The Ron Clark Story on IMDB

1972 births
Living people
Schoolteachers from North Carolina
East Carolina University alumni
People from Beaufort County, North Carolina
Educators from New York City
Survivor (American TV series) contestants
Gay men
LGBT people from North Carolina
20th-century American LGBT people
21st-century American LGBT people